The 1987 Nebraska Cornhuskers football team represented the University of Nebraska–Lincoln in the 1987 NCAA Division I-A football season. The team was coached by Tom Osborne and played their home games in Memorial Stadium in Lincoln, Nebraska.

Schedule

Roster and coaching staff

Depth chart

Game summaries

Utah State

Nebraska QB Steve Taylor rushed for 157 yards, breaking a 35-year-old Cornhusker quarterback record, and Nebraska returned two punts for touchdowns, tying its own Big 8 record.  Nebraska rolled over Utah State with 515 rushing yards while holding the Aggies to -1 yard.

UCLA

Memorial Stadium recorded its 150th consecutive sellout as #2 Nebraska defeated #3 UCLA. This was the first time two teams from the Top 3 had played in Lincoln.  Nebraska QB Steve Taylor's five TD passes tied a Big 8 record set in 1938.

Arizona State

Following a late ASU game-tying score resulting from a fumble by Nebraska QB Steve Taylor, Nebraska IB Keith Jones tore off a 62-yard run with 3:37 remaining to set up the winning series as Nebraska triumphed over the #12 Sun Devils.

South Carolina

South Carolina was leading 21-13 in the 3rd as Nebraska QB Steve Taylor left the game with a shoulder injury.  After that, Nebraska regained the momentum, holding the Gamecocks to just 9 yards total, recovering a fumble to set up a score, and adding a late interception and field goal to put up the win.

Kansas

Nebraska cruised against a weak Kansas team, as Nebraska QB Clete Blakeman filled in for injured starting QB Steve Taylor.

Oklahoma State

Nebraska continued their 26-year winning streak against the Cowboys, putting a stop to #12 Oklahoma State's best start and best winning streak since 1945.  Cowboys RB Thurman Thomas, at that time the NCAA rushing leader, was held to just 7 yards in 9 carries.

Kansas State

Nebraska secured their 26th consecutive winning season, tying the NCAA record, and rolled up 459 rushing yards using 17 rushing players, while the Cornhusker defense prevented a touchdown for the third game in a row.

Missouri

The NCAA touchdown pass record from 1938 was tied by Nebraska for the second time in this season as the Cornhusker offense scored in all four quarters for the 4th game in a row, though the defense finally allowed their first touchdown in 15 quarters.

Iowa State

The Cornhuskers locked up their 19th consecutive 9-win season while piling up 666 total yards of offense as they rocketed to a 28-0 halftime lead before coasting to another win.

Oklahoma

Billed as "Game of the Century II", this first-ever #1 vs. #2 matchup in Memorial Stadium brought a halt to the Cornhuskers' title hopes.  Nebraska had taken away Oklahoma's #1 ranking before this game, and gave it back as the Cornhuskers struggled to move the ball after their first and only score.  The Sooners went on to win their 4th straight Big 8 Championship.

Colorado

Nebraska recovered from the Oklahoma loss and obtained their revenge for last year's loss to Colorado by taking out their frustrations on the Buffaloes in Boulder.  Nebraska IB Keith Jones' 248 yards lifted him into a career 3rd-place ranking among Cornhusker runners.

Florida State

Nebraska lost after leading by 4 midway through the 4th.  A Seminole defender stripped the ball from Nebraska IB Tyreese Knox as he ran in from the FSU 2, which set up a 97-yard FSU march for the winning touchdown with 3:07 left to play.

Rankings

Awards

NFL and pro players
The following Nebraska players who participated in the 1987 season later moved on to the next level and joined a professional or semi-pro team as draftees or free agents.

References

Nebraska
Nebraska Cornhuskers football seasons
Nebraska Cornhuskers football